Jayne Pupek (March 8, 1962 – August 30, 2010) was an American poet and fiction writer.  She wrote and published two collections of poetry: The Livelihood of Crows (Mayapple Press, 2010) and Forms of Intercession (Mayapple Press, 2008), and one novel, Tomato Girl (Algonquin, 2008), which was called a "wrenching, stunning, and pitch-perfect novel that captures the best of Southern literature's finest storytelling colors" by  Library Journal and "an absorbing, unsettling debut" by  Publishers Weekly. Writing for the Courier-Journal, critic L. Elisabeth Beattie notes:  "Jayne Pupek's first novel puts her among the ranks of Southern masters like McCullers and O'Connor" Pupek's work has appeared in numerous journals and anthologies, and has received multiple nominations for the Pushcart Prize. Tomato Girl was also published as an audio book by Recorded Books as part of their Southern Voices Audio Imprint.

Publications (partial list)

Books 
 The Livelihood of Crows (Mayapple Press, 2010) 
 Forms of Intercession (Mayapple Press, 2008) 
 Tomato Girl (Algonquin, 2008)

Work included in anthologies 
 "Tomboy" (Just Like a Girl:A Manifesta, GirlChild Press) 
 "Some Days" (Beyond Forgetting: Poetry and Prose about Alzheimer’s Disease, Kent State University Press) 
 "The Awakening" (Afternoon Delight: Erotica for Couples, Cleis Press) 
 "In a Station of the Metro" (Sixty Stories of Sudden Sex, Cleis Press) 
 "20 Reason I'm Not Writing Today" and "The Xerox Girls" (Ectoplasmic Necropolis, Blood Pudding Press) (chapbook)

Awards and honors 
 "Letter to Eli,"  nominated for the Pushcart Prize
 "Ghost Child", nominated for Best of the Web 2007
 "Tomato Girl,"  listed on Overbooked's hotlist for New and Notable Fiction for 2008

References

External links

Reviews 
 galatea resurrects #12 (a poetry engagement)
 Pedestal Magazine

Author interviews 
 We Dream Colors: An Interview with Jayne Pupek (September–December 2008)
 A Conversation with Jayne Pupek (Feb 1, 2009)
 An Interview with First Time Novelist Jayne Pupek (August 18, 2008)

1962 births
2010 deaths
21st-century American novelists
21st-century American women writers
American women poets
American women novelists
Poets from Virginia
21st-century American poets
Chapbook writers
20th-century American poets
20th-century American novelists
20th-century American women writers
Novelists from Virginia